Danis may refer to:

 Danis (butterfly), a genus of butterfly in the family Lycaenidae
 Danis Goulet (born 1977), Canadian Cree-Métis film director and screenwriter
 Yann Danis (born 1981), Canadian professional ice hockey goaltender
 György Danis (1945–2012), Hungarian physician and politician
 Marcel Danis (born 1943), Canadian university administrator, lawyer and former politician